I'm in the Mood is a studio album by American R&B and Boogie-woogie pianist and vocalist Little Willie Littlefield.

Content
The album was recorded in 1983 at The Farmsound Studio in Heelsum in the Netherlands and released on the Oldie Blues label as OL 8006. An expanded version of the LP was released on CD in 1993 as OLCD 7002 containing tracks from I'm In The Mood and Houseparty. Original LP and CD are produced by Martin van Olderen.

Track listings and formats

Personnel
 Little Willie Littlefield - piano, vocals
 Tony Littlefield - vocals
 Harry Noordhof - bass
 Diederik van Hamersveld, Han Bennink - drums
 Jan Cees Tans - tenor sax

References

 

Little Willie Littlefield albums
Oldie Blues albums
1983 albums